is a 2009 Japanese drama film directed by Kichitaro Negishi. It is based on the 1947 short story of the same name by Osamu Dazai.

Synopsis
Sachi is the long-suffering wife of popular novelist Otani in post-World War II Japan. Brilliant but self-destructive, Otani spends his days drinking, running up debts, and looking for inspiration with other women. A visit from Miyo and Kichizo, the owners of the tavern which Otani frequents, informs Sachi that her husband has run up a fortune in debts and has stolen money from them. To pay off the debt, Sachi becomes a waitress at the bar, where her beauty and warmth bring in new customers. While working at the bar, she meets a young laborer, Okada, who falls in love with her. Also on hand are Sachi's old boyfriend, Tsuji, and her husband's mistress, Akiko. Though increasingly empowered by her new independence, Sachi retains her allegiance to her husband.

Cast
 Takako Matsu as Sachi
 Tadanobu Asano as Otani
 Shigeru Muroi as Miyo
 Masatō Ibu as Kichizo
 Ryōko Hirosue as Akiko
 Satoshi Tsumabuki as Okada
 Shinichi Tsutsumi as Tsuji
 Ken Mitsuishi
 Mirai Yamamoto

Release
The film premiered at the Montreal World Film Festival in September 2009 and was released theatrically in Japan on 10 October 2009.

It was released in New York in July 2010 and had its UK premiere in December 2010.

Home media
Villon's Wife was released on DVD in Japan in April 2010 and in Hong Kong in May 2010.

Awards
2009 Montreal World Film Festival
 Best Director: Kichitaro Negishi
33rd Japan Academy Prize
 Best Actress: Takako Matsu
 Best Art Direction: Yohei Taneda and Kyōko Yauchi
34th Hochi Film Award
 Best Actress: Takako Matsu
2010 Kinema Junpo Award
 Best Actress: Takako Matsu
23rd Nikkan Sports Film Award
 Best Actress: Takako Matsu

References

External links
 
 
 
 

2009 films
2009 drama films
Japanese drama films
Films based on short fiction
Films based on works by Japanese writers
Toho films
Films directed by Kichitaro Negishi
2000s Japanese films